Rebecca Blake Eames (February 1, 1641 - May 8, 1721) was among those accused of witchcraft during the Salem witch trials of 1692.

Rebecca Eames was in the crowd at the August 19, 1692, hanging of witches in Salem when she was accused of causing a pinprick in the foot of another spectator. She was arrested. Eames later testified that the devil had appeared to her as a colt and had persuaded her to follow him. She testified that she had allowed her son Daniel (born 1663) to be baptized by the devil. She confessed to afflicting Timothy Swan.

She was examined again on August 31, 1692 by John Hathorne and Jonathan Corwin. She repeated her confession and implication of her son Daniel as a wizard and her confession of afflicting Timothy Swan. She also implicated "Toothaker Widow" [Margaret Toothaker] and Abigail Faulkner as fellow witches.

Mary Walcott, Mary Warren and Ann Putnam Jr. gave testimony on September 15 that they had been afflicted by Rebecca Eames. She was tried and convicted on September 17, with nine others. They were all condemned to die. Four of those nine were executed on September 22. In October, the Court of Oyer and Terminer was dissolved. Rebecca Eames remained in Salem prison. On December 5, she submitted a petition to Governor Phips retracting her "false and untrue" confession, saying she had been "hurried out of my Senses" by Abigail Hobbs and Mary Lacey who had said she would be hanged if she did not confess. Her husband, Robert Eames, died on July 22, 1693, four months after his wife's release from prison.

Life
Born in February 1641 in Gloucester, Massachusetts, she married  Robert Eames, an immigrant from England, in 1661 in Andover, Massachusetts. She died on May 8, 1721 in Boxford, Massachusetts.

Children:
Hannah Eames, b December 18, 1661, d July 8, 1731, at Andover, Essex, Mass.
Daniel Eames, b April 7, 1663, d AFT 1695
Robert Eames, b February 28, 1667/68, d AFT 1698
John Eames, b October 11, 1670, d July 24, 1726 at Groton, Middlesex, Mass.
Dorothy Eames, b December 20, 1674
Jacob Eames, b July 20, 1677, d AFT 1700
Joseph Eames, b October 9, 1681, d December 27, 1753 at Boxford, Essex, Mass
Nathaniel Eames, b November 19, 1685, d January 11, 1765 at Boxford, Essex, Mass

Further reading
 Upham, Charles (1980). Salem Witchcraft. New York: Frederick Ungar Publishing Co. v 2 pp. 324, 480

Notes

References

1641 births
1721 deaths
American people executed for witchcraft
People from Gloucester, Massachusetts
People of the Salem witch trials